Metal Marines is a real-time strategy video game developed by Namco for the Super Nintendo Entertainment System. It was ported to Microsoft Windows PCs by Mindscape. It was later released in Japan under the title of Militia. The Super NES version was re-released on the Virtual Console in Japan on July 10, 2007, for the Wii and on March 4, 2015, for the Wii U, and in North America on October 15, 2007, for the Wii.

Plot and gameplay

Plot
The game is set in the year 2117, two years after a cataclysmic Antimatter War. The player leads a military force whose main unit is the Metal Marine: a 16-meter (50 ft) high, 93-plus ton mecha.

The PC and SNES versions of the game feature a number of minor gameplay differences, namely the plot. In the PC version the player controls a commander of the "United Earth Empire" ("Empire" in short) a futuristic version of United Nations. The adversarial Zorguef's force is a dictatorial government. After conquering all space colonies, Zorguef sets his eyes on Earth and the player must take up arms to protect the planet. In the SNES version the player controls a commander of the "Space Colonies Allied Forces" ("SCAF" in short), an alliance formed by the independent space colonies. The primary mission is to take the battle to the Earth, which is currently in the grip of Zorguef's empire. The goal is to save the humans living on Earth who are being oppressed by Zorguef while securing the future of Space Colonies.

A special "Master Edition" of the PC version was released by Mindscape in 1995. In the Master Edition the characters were given voices, the overall look of the GUI changed, and the game featured better sound and warning effects.

In both versions, the game composes of 20 missions where the player will slowly regain the conquered territories of the Earth until the enemy force is defeated. The game is played in an isometrical style when building and in an aerial grid style when planning an attack to the enemy territory. In the PC version both players can attack at the same time, while the SNES version only admits one attack at the time from one of the factions.

Characters
The Player: In the PC version the player's character is the commander of the Empire whose mission is to defend the Earth and repel Zorguef's invasion. In the SNES version the player instead is the SCAF commander tasked with the reconquest of the Earth that is now in control of Zorguef's Empire.
Ernest Bowman: In the PC version, he is called J.R. Bowman, and acts as both the Sergeant who trains you in Mission Zero (Training) and as the main advisor for the Empire, also being the former SCAF High Commander. In the SNES version he is called Ernest Bowman instead, while he acts as the Intelligence Advisor for the SCAF, also being the former Earth Federal Force commander.
Onaka Kraft: Sergeant Onaka Kraft acts as the communications officer whose duty is to inform the player when an enemy message is being transmitted. In the PC version she works for the Empire while in the SNES version she is a SCAF officer.
Harlan Sanders: Sergeant Harlan Sanders acts as the logistics officer of the Empire in the PC version, while also acts as the main engineer in control of the Metal marine infrastructure and logistics. He doesn't have an equivalent in the SNES version, but it can be supposed that he works in the SNES version as a Sergeant and engineer for the SCAF and the Metal Marines.
William "Bill" Garland: Commander Bill Garland is the first enemy the player will face. In the PC version he is the SCAF's North American invasion commander, while in the SNES version he acts as the North American theatre commander for the Empire.
Joan Bile: Commander Joan Bile acts as a support enemy commander who commands attacks in some instances where the other commanders can't act as efficiently. In the PC version she works for the SCAF and she is named Joan Rile. In the SNES version she is one of the Empire's commanders instead.
Liften Schwaltz: High Commander Liften Schwaltz is the third enemy the player will fight. In the PC version he is the European invasion commander and second in command of the SCAF, while in the SNES version he is the Empire's European theater commander.
Nikolai I. Zorguef: The main leader of the enemy faction of the game. In the PC version he is referred as Zorgeuf the Great. In the SNES version he is instead named as General Nikolai I. Zorguef, the Great.

Gameplay
Inside the game the player focuses on building both offensive and defensive structures to be able to attack the enemy territory and defend his own. Every structure except the I.C.B.M. silo occupies one square into the map. The list of buildings disponible to both factions are:

Bases: Bases are the most important building in the game. The player builds three bases in the island before starting the operation. The enemy can have one, two or three bases per mission. Bases can't be rebuilt, and the loss of all the bases in the player island is an automatic Game Over. The loss of every base of the enemy commander permits the player to advance to the next operation.
Missiles: The standard long-range weapon against the enemy structures, it costs 4K energy to launch. The missile attack damages a 3x3 square area from where it impacts. It can be upgraded to a double missile which requires 8K energy instead per attack. Both the player and the enemy can launch a maximum of 4 missiles per attack.
Anti Air Batteries (A.A Missile): The only way to defend your island against enemy missiles and enemy transport ships. They launch a single missile against enemy missiles and transports with a starting 50% chance to hit. A missile requires one hit to be destroyed while transports require eight hits instead. It can be upgraded to a double A.A Missile launcher which launches two missiles at once.
Metal Marine: The game's nameshake. It is a robot that can be used to attack the enemy territory or to defend yours. The standard unit is called Gunner-I, has 40HP and does 8HP of damage per attack. An upgraded Metal Marine is called Gunner-II and gets golden decorations, a bit more walking speed, 60HP and does 9HP damage instead. Only three Metal Marines can be selected to attack the enemy territory being transported in a transport aircraft. Also only three Metal Marines at once will defend your island from enemy Metal Marines. Metal Marines have three different weapons to attack:
Normal Gun (NORMAL): Does the same damage against Metal Marines and Gun Pods (100%-Marine/100%-Pod). The long range gun is a gatling gun and the short range gun is a blue sword.
Anti Metal Marine Rifle (Anti MMR): Does 50% more damage to an enemy Metal Marine but instead does 50% less damage to Gun Pod bunkers (150%-Marine/50%-Pod). The long range gun is a rifle and the short range gun is an axe.
Anti Gun-Pod Bunker (Anti POD): Does 50% more damage to Gun Pod bunkers but instead does 50% less damage to enemy Metal Marines (50%-Marine/150%-Pod). The long range gun is a bazooka-like howitzer and the short range gun is a purple electric whip.
Gun Pods: The standard land defense unit. It has the same resistance as a Metal marine and does almost the same damage. Only a Gunner-I AT-MMR Metal Marine in full HP or less will succumb to a Gun Pod bunker. AT-POD and NORMAL Metal Marines in full HP can destroy a Gun Pod bunker while surviving.
Land mines: Land mines are invisible to the enemy faction in the map. They can be destroyed by enemy missiles and activated by enemy Metal Marines.  Every land mine causes 30HP damage to a Metal Marine.
Anti-Air Radar: Every radar station built in your island increases the hit chance of every A.A Missile per 5% to a max of 100% effectiveness.
I.C.B.M. Silo: Most expensive building, slowest to build and biggest in size, as it occupies a 3x3 square landzone. The I.C.B.M. silo needs to have all of its nine squares intact to be able to work, if a single square is destroyed it can't launch the I.C.B.M. weapon. The launch cost is 950K energy and uses the same anti-matter resource that started the 2117 incident. I.C.B.M. weapons cannot be taken down by A.A. batteries as they do not get in range for them, so it is a guaranteed destruction of a 3X3 diamond radius for a total of 25 squares of enemy land.
Supply Headquarters (Supply-HQ): Every Supply-HQ building the player has will provide one more money fund flow per second (+$1/s).
Energy Plant: Every energy plant the player has will provide one more energy kilowatt per second (+1K/s).
Factory: Every factory the player has speeds the building and upgrading time of every structure in your island.
Dummy Base: Dummy bases look like bases, but have less HP. They are used as decoys to trick the enemy.
Dummy Unit: Dummy units are square terrains that cover your bases and make them get undetected by the enemy. The attack of a single missile or Metal marine with any weapon destroys it immediately, so they are better used as base concealments.

Reception

References

External links
 

1993 video games
Real-time strategy video games
Super Nintendo Entertainment System games
Windows games
Virtual Console games
Virtual Console games for Wii U
Video games with isometric graphics
Mindscape games